Həsənqala (also, Gasankala) is a village and municipality in the Khachmaz Rayon of Azerbaijan.  It has a population of 1,568.  The municipality consists of the villages of Həsənqala and Bala Qusarqışlaq.

References 

Populated places in Khachmaz District